Cigaritis myrmecophila is a butterfly in the family Lycaenidae. It is found from Algeria through Libya, Egypt and Jordan to Arabia and south-eastern Iran.

The larvae feed on Calligonum comosum. They live in the nests of ants of the genus Crematogaster.

References

Butterflies described in 1922
Cigaritis
Butterflies of Asia